Sanjwal Railway Station (Urdu and ) is located in Sanjwal village, Attock district of Punjab province, Pakistan.

See also
 List of railway stations in Pakistan
 Pakistan Railways

References

External links

Railway stations in Attock District
Railway stations on Karachi–Peshawar Line (ML 1)